John Jackson (born 21 February 1986) is an Ireland men's field hockey international. He was a member of the Ireland team that won the bronze medal at the 2015 Men's EuroHockey Nations Championship. He also represented Ireland at the 2016 Summer Olympics. At club level, he has played for both Loughborough Students and Reading in the Euro Hockey League. He also won the EHA Cup with Reading in 2014–15.

Early years, family and education
Jackson's father, Peter Jackson, has been involved in hockey since the 1970s as a player, coach, manager, administrator and supporter. He played for Collegians, Parkview and Mossley. Between 2003 and 2018 he served as the Ireland men's national field hockey team manager. Jackson's mother also acted as the team doctor at the 2014–15 Men's FIH Hockey World League Semifinals. Between 1997 and 2003 John Jackson attended Ballyclare High School. Between 2003 and 2004 he attended the Royal Belfast Academical Institution. Jackson subsequently attended Loughborough University were he completed a degree in Ergonomics. In 2013 Jackson married Dr. Rachel Arnold, a fellow graduate of Loughborough University. She works as a sports psychologist in the Department for Health at the University of Bath. She is also field hockey player and has played for Team Bath Buccaneers, Loughborough Students and Clifton.

Domestic teams

Mossley
Jackson began playing field hockey as a four-year old at Mossley 
 He continued playing for Mossley until he left for Loughborough University in 2004. He returned to Mossley during the 2010–11 season while working for Sport Northern Ireland. In December 2017 he returned to Mossley and helped them reach the final of the Kirk Cup.

RBAI
In 2003–04, together with Paul Gleghorne and Michael Watt, Jackson was a member of the Royal Belfast Academical Institution team that won the McCullough Cup, the Burney Cup and the All Ireland Schoolboys Hockey Championship.

Loughborough Students
Between 2004 and 2010 Jackson played for Loughborough Students. Jackson captained Loughborough Students and was named player of the year in 2005–06 and 2009–10. Together with Paul Gleghorne, he also played for Loughborough in the 2007–08 Euro Hockey League.

Braxgata
Between 2011 and 2013 Jackson played as a professional for Braxgata in the Men's Belgian Hockey League.

Reading
Between 2013 and 2016 Jackson played for Reading in the Men's England Hockey League. Together with Chris Cargo, he also played for Reading in the 2013–14 Euro Hockey League. In 2014–15, Jackson helped Reading win the EHA Cup.

Team Bath Buccaneers
In 2016 Jackson began playing for Team Bath Buccaneers in Tier 2 of the Men's England Hockey League (MEHL). In the autumn of 2019, Jackson suffered the second hockey-related skull fracture of his career, during training with the Buccaneers; by January 2021, he had recovered enough to return to training with the team, preparing for competition in Tier 2 of the 2021–22 MEHL season.

Ireland international
Jackson made his senior debut for Ireland in June 2006 against England. He was a member of the Ireland teams that won the 2009 Men's EuroHockey Nations Trophy and the 2011 Men's Hockey Champions Challenge II. Jackson also helped Ireland win Men's FIH Hockey World League tournaments in 2012 and 2015. Jackson captained Ireland at the 2013 Men's EuroHockey Nations Championship and he scored the equaliser in a 3–3 draw against the Czech Republic. This draw secured Ireland's place in the top level of EuroHockey Nations Championship. He has since captained Ireland over forty times. He was also a member of the Ireland team that won the bronze medal at the 2015 Men's EuroHockey Nations Championship. He also represented Ireland at the 2016 Summer Olympics. In June 2017 Jackson was a member of the Ireland team that won the Hamburg Masters, defeating Germany 4–2 in the final. In July 2019, during a two-match series against Scotland, Jackson became the third Ireland men's international, after Eugene Magee and Ronan Gormley, to make 250 senior appearances. In December 2021, having already returned to his Bath Buccaneers club from an autumn 2020 skull fracture, Jackson was a member of the Irish side that played three indoor friendlies against Scotland.

Coaching and teaching
Throughout his field hockey playing career, Jackson has also worked as coach. Between 2004 and 2010, while attending Loughborough University he coached several university teams. During this time he also coached at Ratcliffe College. Between April 2010 and September 2011, Jackson worked for Sport Northern Ireland as an 'active communities' coach, coaching elderly, disabled and youth groups. Between 2011 and 2013, while playing for Braxgata, he served as an assistant coach of the women's first eleven and as head coach of the under-16 girls team that won a 2012–13 national championship.

In September 2013 he was appointed senior hockey coach at Marlborough College, and began coaching youth teams at Marlborough Hockey Club. In 2016 he was appointed head of hockey at Prior Park College, Bath, where he also teaches academic Physical education. He also began coaching the University of Bath Hockey Club women's first eleven.

Honours
Ireland
Hamburg Masters
Winners: 2017 
Men's FIH Hockey World League Round 1
Winners: 2012 Cardiff
Men's FIH Hockey World League Round 2
Winners: 2015 San Diego
Runners up: 2013 New Delhi
Men's FIH Series Finals
Runners up: 2019 Le Touquet
Men's Hockey Champions Challenge II
Winners: 2011
Runners up: 2009
Men's EuroHockey Nations Trophy
Winners: 2009
Men's Field Hockey Olympic Qualifier
Runners up: 2012
Men's Hockey Investec Cup
Runners up: 2014
Reading
EHA Cup
Winners: 2014–15
Mossley
Kirk Cup
Runners up: 2017
RBAI
All Ireland Schoolboys Hockey Championship
Winners: 2003–04
Burney Cup
Winners: 2003–04
McCullough Cup
Winners: 2003–04

References

1986 births
Living people
Irish field hockey coaches
Ireland international men's field hockey players
Male field hockey players from Northern Ireland
Irish male field hockey players
British male field hockey players
Olympic field hockey players of Ireland
Field hockey players at the 2016 Summer Olympics
Loughborough Students field hockey players
Reading Hockey Club players
Team Bath Buccaneers Hockey Club players
Men's England Hockey League players
Men's Belgian Hockey League players
Male field hockey midfielders
Male field hockey defenders
Expatriate field hockey players
Irish expatriate sportspeople in Belgium
Irish expatriate sportspeople in England
Sportspeople from County Antrim
People educated at Ballyclare High School
People educated at the Royal Belfast Academical Institution
Alumni of Loughborough University
TeamBath coaches